ADP-ribosylation factor-like protein 1 is a protein that in humans is encoded by the ARL1 gene.

Function 

The protein encoded by this gene belongs to the ARL (ADP-ribosylation factor-like) family of proteins, which are structurally related to ADP-ribosylation factors (ARFs). ARFs, described as activators of cholera toxin (CT) ADP-ribosyltransferase activity, regulate intracellular vesicular membrane trafficking, and stimulate a phospholipase D (PLD) isoform. Although, ARL proteins were initially thought not to activate CT or PLD, later work showed that they are weak stimulators of PLD and CT in a phospholipid dependent manner.

Interactions 

ARL1 has been shown to interact with GOLGA4 and GOLGA1.

References

External links

Further reading